"In the Ayer" is the third single from rapper Flo Rida's debut album Mail on Sunday. It was produced by and features will.i.am. Tiffany Villarreal performs the background vocals, but she is uncredited. The song's backdrop and beat are an uncredited sample from Pretty Tony's freestyle classic "Jam the Box". The song has been certified platinum by the RIAA, making it his second song to do so.

The official remix features Rick Ross, Brisco and Billy Blue with original chorus by will.i.am and new Flo Rida verses.

From 2009 to 2012, this was the victory song for the Baltimore Orioles at home.

Background
A year before the song was released, will.i.am was at Los Angeles's KIIS FM (102.7) doing a freestyle for Jojo Wright over the instrumental of "Easy" by Paula DeAnda. He described the freestyle as a "hot hook". The beat production was done by Timbaland with the help of DJ Tweak from Lakeland, FL.

Music video
The video premiered on FNMTV on Friday June 13, 2008. A clip of video was showcased by Pete Wentz of Fall Out Boy in an MTV commercial announcing their new music video blocks. Video appearances made are Rick Ross and Brisco.

Chart performance
In the U.S., "In the Ayer" debuted at No. 38 on the Billboard Hot 100. The song would eventually become Flo Rida's third top twenty and second top ten hit on the Billboard Hot 100, peaking at No. 9. It has also been a hit on pop, reaching No. 14 on the Pop 100, and No. 12 on Mainstream Top 40 radio. It has also reached No. 9 so far on the New Zealand RIANZ chart, making it Flo Rida's third consecutive top ten hit there. It recently debuted at No. 23 on the Australian ARIA charts and  later peaking at number 19. On the Canadian Hot 100 it has so far peaked at No. 13, giving Flo Rida his third top twenty there.

On September 7, 2008, the song entered the UK Singles Chart at No. 46 on downloads alone and peaked at No. 29.

Charts and certifications

Weekly charts

Year-end charts

Certifications

References

2008 singles
Flo Rida songs
Will.i.am songs
Songs written by will.i.am
Music videos directed by Shane Drake
2008 songs
Songs written by Flo Rida
Atlantic Records singles